Rune Ulvestad (born 28 March 1957) is a Norwegian football coach and former player. He played as a forward for Molde from 1978 to 1986. After his active career, Ulvestad has been coaching Herd. He is the father of the footballers Pål Erik, Fredrik and Dan Peter Ulvestad.

Career
After playing for Brattvåg IL, Ulvestad joined Molde FK ahead of the 1978-season, and was Molde's top goalscorer in 1981 and 1985. Ulvestad scored Molde's first goal in the final of the 1982 Norwegian Cup, a game Molde lost 2–3 against Brann. Ulvestad played a total of 107 matches and scored 29 goals for Molde in the top division until he joined Aalesunds FK after the 1986-season.

Ulvestad have later been coaching SK Herd.

Personal life
Ulvestad is the father of the footballers Dan Peter, Pål Erik, Fredrik and Andreas. In 2011, Fredrik won the Norwegian Cup with Aalesund, while Pål Erik won Tippeligaen with Molde.

References

1957 births
Living people
Norwegian footballers
Brattvåg IL players
Molde FK players
Aalesunds FK players
Eliteserien players
Norwegian First Division players
Association football forwards